Niambia capensis is a species of woodlouse in the family Platyarthridae. It is found in Africa and North America.

References

Isopoda
Articles created by Qbugbot
Crustaceans described in 1895